The Shirani are a Baloch tribe of Iranian Balochistan.

References 

Baloch tribes
Ethnic groups in Iran
Balochi-language surnames
Pakistani names